Leeds was a parliamentary borough covering the town of Leeds, in the West Riding of Yorkshire, England. It was represented in the House of Commons of the Parliament of the United Kingdom from 1832 to 1885.

The borough returned two Members of Parliament (MPs) until 1868, and then three MPs from 1868 until the Redistribution of Seats Act 1885 split the borough into five divisions at the 1885 general election.

Boundaries and History

Representation before 1832
Until the 1832 United Kingdom general election the major town of Leeds was represented in Parliament solely as a part of the county constituency of Yorkshire. The only exceptions had been that the town was represented as a single member borough in the First and Second Protectorate Parliaments from 1654 to 1658.

Before 1832 no new English Parliamentary borough had been enfranchised since the 1670s, but Leeds came close to being represented from 1826. Stooks Smith, in The Parliaments of England, explained what happened.

Immediately after the Parliament elected in 1818 had assembled in 1819, a petition was presented to the House of Commons, complaining in the usual terms, that gross bribery and corruption had been practised in the return of the two Members for the Borough of Grampound, in Cornwall. In the course of the Session the matter was minutely investigated and the alleged guilt incontrovertibly proved. The course of procedure in such cases was to pass an act disfranchising the place convicted, and transferring the right so abused and forfeited, to some other body of Electors. It devolved upon Lord John Russell, who had conducted the proceedings in the House of Commons ... to originate a Bill for the above purpose. On the meeting of the New Parliament, April 28th, Lord J. Russell gave notice that he should bring in his proposed bill for disfranchising Grampound and transferring the privilege to Leeds. The Bill was ... framed to extend the right of voting to all Householders rated at or over £5 per annum, which it was estimated would constitute a body of, at least 8,000 Electors for the Borough. When the ... measure came under discussion ... Mr Beaumont ... suggested that the County of York should be divided into two Counties, one consisting of the West Riding and the other of the North and East Ridings combined; and, that instead of giving two representatives to Leeds, they should be granted to either of these divisions - Mr Wynn ... objected ... but was the first to recommend that the two new Members be transferred to the County of York, in addition to the two it already returned. ... The Legislature ... assembled in January 1821 ... Mr Beaumont renewed his objection ... upon which a division took place. The numbers were, for the amendment 66, against it 126, leaving a majority of 60 in favour of the measure peoposed by Lord John Russell. The Bill, as introduced this session, so far deviated from that of the previous year as to confer the Elective franchise upon the Mayor and Corporation of Leeds, and all Householders within the Borough, assessed at not less than Ten Pounds instead of Five Pounds per annum to the poor and parish rates. This provision, it was found on examination, would still have thrown the right of returning members, chiefly into the hands of the inferior classes, and necessarily have fostered those impure and unprincipled practices, notoriously prevalent in places similarly privileged. Mr J.A.S. Wortley to remedy this defect, moved ... that the qualification should be limited to Householders rated at not less than Twenty Pounds per annum ... in its amended form the Bill passed the House of Commons. 

The House of Lords amended the bill, as Mr Wynn had originally proposed, so Leeds had to wait until 1832 for enfranchisement. 
 
Yorkshire was the largest of the historic counties of England. Between 1826 and 1832 the undivided county returned four Members of Parliament to the House of Commons, instead of the traditional two knights of the shire which the county had sent before then and all other English counties elected up until 1832.

County representation from 1832
The Reform Act 1832 divided Yorkshire into three county constituencies, which each returned two members. The divisions were based on the three ridings, which were traditional sub-divisions of Yorkshire. Leeds was part of the West Riding of Yorkshire and thus fell within that Riding constituency.

Charles Seymour, in Electoral Reform in England and Wales, commented about the debate in 1832 about the non resident freeholder vote. This was a particularly important issue for the West Riding because the major towns of Bradford, Leeds and Sheffield and the important ones of Halifax, Huddersfield and Wakefield were all to become new Parliamentary boroughs in 1832.

Though the general principle of the freeholder franchise was accepted without debate, one aspect of the question gave rise to much discussion at the time ... . The bill provided that the freeholders in boroughs who did not occupy their property should vote in the counties in which the borough was situated. This clause drew forth a torrent of complaint, especially from the Conservatives. Peel pointed out that it would be far simpler for the freeholders in the represented boroughs to vote in the borough where their property was situate instead of being forced to travel to the county polling place; moreover if the borough freeholders were allowed to vote in the counties he felt that the boroughs would have an unfair influence in county elections and the rural element would be submerged by the urban.

... Althorp ... pointed out that until 1832 freeholders in the unrepresented towns always had voted in the counties, so the Tories could hardly complain that the ministers were introducing new principles to favour urban interests ... .

Stooks Smith records the number of electors in the Leeds polling district of the West Riding of Yorkshire constituency, at a by-election in 1835, as 2,250 (out of a total electorate of 18,063). Although it is not known if all these Leeds area voters were qualified as non-resident 
freeholders in the borough, the numbers given for this and other polling districts named after Parliamentary boroughs suggest that up to two-thirds of the county voters in the West Riding might have qualified on that basis.

Borough representation from 1832
The remainder of this article deals with the borough representation only, which is its focus.

In addition to the county constituency changes, the Representation of the People Act 1832 enfranchised the town as a new two member Parliamentary borough. The Parliamentary Boundaries Act 1832 defined that borough as comprising the parish of Leeds.

Lord John Russell, who was the member of the Whig government most involved in taking the reform legislation through Parliament in 1832, still favoured a more extensive franchise than Tory Party spokesmen - just as had been the case more than a decade earlier. However, Russell now had a House of Commons more favourable to his point of view.

A uniform borough franchise was introduced, on top of the various ancient right franchises found in the old Parliamentary boroughs: (see the Unreformed House of Commons for a list of the different franchises in each borough). The new boroughs, like Leeds, had no ancient right borough voters so only the new franchise rules applied to them. 
Seymour explains that:-

Only one class of new rights was created by the act of 1832. This was the £10 occupation qualification. According to the act, the franchise was granted to all male persons who for a year before registration had occupied as owner or tenants "any house, warehouse, country house, shop or other building, either separately or jointly with any land" of a clear yearly value of £10. The land must be within the electoral limits of the borough; and in order to qualify, the occupier must have been rated in respect of such premises, to all rates for the relief of the poor; and he must have paid at the time of registration all rates and taxes due from him the preceding April. 
This occupation franchise was the characteristic of the borough franchise after 1832. As ownership furnished the ordinary qualification for franchise in the counties, so in the boroughs, occupation, actual or constructive, was the basis of the suffrage. While however, in the counties no provision was made for ascertaining the true value or bona fide rent which was to qualify for the franchise; in the boroughs, assessment to the taxes was embodied with the condition of value, and actual payment was super-added. There was another difference between the character of the county and borough franchises, as determined by the Reform Act. In the latter no claimant could be registered as a voter if he had received parochial relief within the past twelve months; in the counties, no disqualification was attached to the receipt of poor-relief. ...

Third seat 1867
Under the Representation of the People Act 1867 Leeds was given a third seat, but the individual electors could only cast a maximum of two votes. This limited vote provision was designed to promote minority representation in the larger constituencies, which were mostly major cities. These provisions took effect from the 1868 United Kingdom general election.

Abolition 1885
Under the Redistribution of Seats Act 1885 single member constituencies became the norm. Leeds was divided into five such seats: Leeds Central, Leeds East, Leeds North, Leeds South and Leeds West. The new constituencies were first used for the 1885 United Kingdom general election.

Members of Parliament

MPs 1654–1658 (Protectorate Parliaments)

MPs 1832–1868

MPs 1868–1885

Elections

Elections in the 1830s

 
 
  

  

Macaulay resigned after being appointed as a member of the Council of India, causing a by-election.

Elections in the 1840s

Elections in the 1850s

  
  
 
 

  

Baines was appointed president of the Poor Law Board, requiring a by-election.

Baines was appointed Chancellor of the Duchy of Lancaster, requiring a by-election.

  
 
   

 
 

 

Hall's death caused a by-election.

Elections in the 1860s

 
  

 
 

Seat increased to three members

Elections in the 1870s

 
 
 
 

 

Lees retired before polling day.

Carter resigned, causing a by-election.

Elections in the 1880s

 
 

Gladstone was also elected MP for Midlothian and opted to sit there, causing a by-election.

Gladstone was appointed a Lord Commissioner of the Treasury, requiring a by-election.

References
 British Parliamentary Election Results 1832-1885, compiled and edited by F.W.S. Craig (Macmillan Press 1977)
 Electoral Reform in England and Wales, by Charles Seymour (David & Charles Reprints 1970) originally published in 1915, so out of copyright
 The Parliaments of England by Henry Stooks Smith (1st edition published in three volumes 1844–50), second edition edited (in one volume) by F.W.S. Craig (Political Reference Publications 1973) originally published in 1844-50, so out of copyright
 Who's Who of British Members of Parliament: Volume I 1832-1885, edited by M. Stenton (The Harvester Press 1976)

Notes

History of Leeds
Parliamentary constituencies in Yorkshire and the Humber (historic)
Constituencies of the Parliament of the United Kingdom established in 1832
Constituencies of the Parliament of the United Kingdom disestablished in 1885
Politics of Leeds